Olof Mårtensson (1557 – 17 March 1609) also known in the Latin form Olaus Martini, was Archbishop of Uppsala from 1601 to his death.

Born in Uppsala, Sweden, he first enrolled in the University of Uppsala, but when it was temporarily closed in 1578 he travelled abroad. In 1583 he got a Master's degree at the University of Rostock and then travelled home again. 

On returning, he made himself a reputation when he criticized the liturgy of Swedish King John III who held somewhat Catholics beliefs despite that Sweden had been Lutheran since 1531.

The king's brother Duke Charles, who later became King Charles IX, promoted Olaus to becoming Archbishop of Uppsala in 1601. Despite his support, Martini was fundamentally in opposition to the beliefs of duke Charles, a conflict which eventually led to disputes between the two. Martini was an orthodox Lutheran, while Duke Charles is believed to have been inclined towards Calvinistic tenants—which he himself denied (see: crypto-Calvinism).

In 1606 Martini had a text published which was sharply polemising against Catholic and Calvinistic tenets.

Although he was in opposition to the King and the Duke, he was considered a hard working and trustworthy man by the University of Uppsala and by his communion.

See also 
 List of Archbishops of Uppsala

References

  Nordisk Familjebok (1914), article Olaus Martini In Swedish

Lutheran archbishops of Uppsala
17th-century Lutheran archbishops
People from Uppsala
1557 births
1609 deaths
16th-century Swedish people
17th-century Swedish people
16th-century Swedish writers